Odoarius (bishop 750–780) was a medieval Galician clergyman. His real existence was debated.

References
 Consello da Cultura Galega (ed.), Documentos da Catedral de Lugo, (Santiago de Compostela, 1998)

8th-century Galician bishops
780 deaths